Tetyana Lavrenchuk (born March 3, 1993, in Lviv) is a Ukrainian freestyle wrestler of Dinamo and Spartak sports clubs. She was silver medalist of the 2015 European Games and bronze medalist of the 2013 European Championships.

External links
 Bio of the wrestler can be found here

1993 births
Living people
Ukrainian female sport wrestlers
Sportspeople from Lviv
European Games silver medalists for Ukraine
European Games medalists in wrestling
Wrestlers at the 2015 European Games
21st-century Ukrainian women